Club de Deportes Maipo Quilicura is a Chilean Football club, their home town is the commune of Buin, Chile. It was founded on 1 December 1999, under the name of "Club de Deportes Quilicura", name that was used until the year 2013 in which amounted to professional football of Chile, after that was formed an alliance with the "Club de Deportes Maipo" of the commune of Buín, "El Quili" as is known left his name, colors, emblem and place of origin, to move to the commune of Buin.

The club were founded on 2014 after merged between Deportes Maipo and Deportes Quilicura and played seven seasons in the Tercera División and one season in the Segunda División.

He made his in professional football of Chile on 1 September 2014, in the Estadio Santiago Bueras of Maipú compared to Malleco joined, falling by 0-3.

After 28 games played and to lack of 4 dates for the term of his first season in the professionalism, Deportes Maipo Quilicura fell to the Tercera División, after falling by 4-1 as a visit before Deportes Valdivia on 28 March 2015, after 7 months in football rented.

A few days before the Council of Presidents of the ANFP, for the season 2015-2016, the president of the club reports that his team will take a recess of the championships, and defected from their participation in the Segunda División.

Seasons played
1 season in Segunda División
9 seasons in Tercera División
4 seasons in Cuarta División

Current Squad 2014-15

Honours

Domestic

Cuarta División de Chile
2002
Tercera A de Chile
Runner-up 2013–14
Tercera B de Chile
Runner-up 2009

Football clubs in Chile
Association football clubs established in 2014
Sport in Santiago Metropolitan Region
2014 establishments in Chile